Karl-August Saar (12 August 1887 Vao Parish, Virumaa - 30 November 1941 Sverdlovsk Oblast, Russia) was an Estonian politician. He was a member of Estonian Constituent Assembly. On 6 October 1919, he resigned his position and he was replaced by Peeter Ruubel.

References

1887 births
1941 deaths
Members of the Estonian Constituent Assembly
Prisoners and detainees of the Soviet Union